Paracallia is a genus of longhorn beetles of the subfamily Lamiinae.

 Paracallia bonaldoi Martins & Galileo, 1998
 Paracallia giesberti Martins & Galileo, 2006

References

Calliini
Cerambycidae genera